The 2012-13 Breedon Highland League Cup was the 68th edition of the competition, which was sponsored by Breedon Aggregates.  The winners were Keith, who defeated Inverurie Loco Works 2–1 in the final at Princess Royal Park in Banff on 11 May 2013.

First round

In the First Round draw, fourteen clubs were given a bye into the Second Round, and four clubs were drawn to play each other in the First Round. Ties in the First Round took place on Saturday 2 March 2013.

Second round

The ties in the Second Round took place on Saturday 16 March 2013.

1 After Extra Time – Deveronvale won 3–1 on penalties 
2 Played on Wednesday 27 March 2013 due to 2 previous postponements due to a waterlogged pitch and a snowbound pitch

Third round

The ties in the Third Round took place on Saturday 6 April 2013.

1 After Extra Time – Keith won 5–4 on penalties

Semi-finals

The semi-final ties took place on Saturday 20 April 2013.

Final

Highland League Cup
Highland League Cup seasons